Frederikshavn Stadion is a multi-use stadium in Frederikshavn, Denmark.  It is used mostly for football matches and is the home stadium of Frederikshavn fI.  The stadium holds 15,000 people.

External links
Entry at Stadions.dk

Football venues in Denmark